Tief is a surname of German origin, meaning "deep" or "low". Notable people with the surname include:

Francis Joseph Tief (1881-1965), American clergyman
Otto Tief (1889–1976), Estonian politician

Surnames of German origin